Gentian is an Albanian masculine given name and may refer to:
Gentian Begeja (born 1973), Albanian footballer
Gentian Buzali (born 1978), Albanian footballer
Gentian Çela (born 1981), Albanian footballer
Gentian Gjondedaj (born 1980), Albanian footballer 
Gentian Hajdari (born 1975), Albanian footballer
Gentian Hervetus (1499–1584), French Roman Catholic theologian
Gentian Koçi (born 1979), Albanian film director and screenwriter
Gentian Lulani (born 1972), Albanian artist
Gentian Mezani (born 1975), Albanian football coach
Gentian Muça (born 1987), Albanian footballer
Gentian Selmani (born 1998), Albanian footballer
Gentian Stojku (born 1974), Albanian footballer
Gentian Zenelaj (born 1977), Albanian actor and comedian  

Albanian masculine given names